Mayfair Festival of the Arts is a multidisciplinary arts festival  (visual arts, performing arts, garden arts, children's art, art education) held annually in Allentown, Pennsylvania.

Mayfair Festival began in 1986 and is now hosted at Cedar Crest College. 

The 2020 festival was cancelled over COVID-19 pandemic concerns but returned over Memorial Day weekend in 2021.

References

External links

1984 establishments in Pennsylvania
Annual events in Pennsylvania
Art festivals in the United States
Culture of Allentown, Pennsylvania
May events
Music festivals in Pennsylvania
Recurring events established in 1986
Tourist attractions in Allentown, Pennsylvania